Central YMCA is an historic building in the Central neighborhood on the east side of Cleveland, Ohio. It was designed by the Cleveland architectural firm Hubbell & Benes and constructed for use as a residential building in 1911 by YMCA of Greater Cleveland. The building served as one of the locations used by Cleveland YMCA School of Technology, which eventually became Fenn College and ultimately Cleveland State University 1964.  Added to the National Register of Historic Places in 1984, Central YMCA building was purchased by Cleveland State University in September 2009 and later renovated for use as student apartments. In 2015, the building was purchased by Asset Student Housing and is now known as The Domain at Cleveland.

References

External links
Downtown Cleveland YMCA Branch

Central, Cleveland
Renaissance Revival architecture in Ohio
Residential buildings completed in 1911
Apartment buildings in Cleveland
Buildings and structures in Cleveland
Cleveland State University
Cleveland
Clubhouses in Ohio
National Register of Historic Places in Cleveland, Ohio
Residential skyscrapers in Cleveland
1911 establishments in Ohio